Somasetty Suresh is an Indian cricketer, who has played 95 first-class matches between 1997 and 2008. Suresh, an all rounder has played Ranji Trophy matches for Assam, Goa and Tamil Nadu, where he captained Tamil Nadu. and has played against England A team representing Tamil Nadu Cricket Association in 2004.

References

External links
 

1973 births
Living people
Tamil Nadu cricketers
Goa cricketers
Indian cricketers
South Zone cricketers
Cricketers from Chennai
Assam cricketers